Le Nouvel Économiste is a French language weekly financial and business magazine published in Paris, France.

History and profile
Le Nouvel Économiste was established in 1975. The magazine was owned by the Hachette S.A until 2002 when it was acquired by the Jacob Abbou group.

The magazine is published on a weekly basis and provides financial news as well as comprehensive reports on company relations and activities. It also features book reviews. Its headquarters is in Paris and is published in pink color.

The target audience of Le Nouvel Économiste include government officials, policy makers, CEOs, investors and high income earners. The magazine has a center-right political stance. The weekly has offered an award of best economist of the year since 1993.

References

External links
 

1975 establishments in France
Book review magazines
Business magazines published in France
French-language magazines
Magazines established in 1975
Magazines published in Paris
Weekly magazines published in France